Johnny O'Clock is a 1947 American film noir crime film starring Dick Powell and Evelyn Keyes, and directed by Robert Rossen.

Plot
Johnny O'Clock (Dick Powell) is a junior partner in a posh casino with Guido Marchettis (Thomas Gomez). Complicating their longtime working relationship is Guido's wife Nelle (Ellen Drew), who is still in love with former boyfriend Johnny. She gives Johnny an expensive custom pocket watch, the twin of a birthday present she gave her husband, except Johnny's has a romantic inscription engraved on the back.

Johnny gives the watch, along with a rejection note, to Harriet Hobson (Nina Foch), a hat-check girl at the casino, to return to Nelle. Harriet, however, apparently commits suicide using gas. Her sister Nancy (Evelyn Keyes) shows up to find out what happened. She becomes attracted to Johnny. They eventually learn from Police Inspector Koch (Lee J. Cobb) that Harriet was killed by poison.

Harriet was dating Chuck Blayden (Jim Bannon), a crooked cop who is trying to persuade Guido to let him take Johnny's place. When Blayden also turns up dead, Koch suspects that either Johnny or Marchettis is responsible.

Though Johnny tries to resist, little by little, he falls for Nancy. When Koch shows both Johnny and Marchettis Johnny's watch and note, Johnny tells Nancy their relationship is through and takes her to the airport. As he is driving away, however, he narrowly survives a drive-by shooting, and Nancy realizes he was only trying to protect her. She refuses to leave him.

Johnny decides to flee to South America with Nancy, but not before brazenly cashing in his share of the casino. Marchettis pulls out a gun when Johnny's back is turned. They shoot it out; Marchettis is killed and Johnny wounded. Afterward, Nelle offers to testify it was self-defense, but only if he will come back to her. He refuses, so she tells Koch it was cold-blooded murder. Johnny's first instinct is to run away, but Nancy convinces him to give himself up.

Cast
 Dick Powell as Johnny O'Clock 
 Evelyn Keyes as Nancy Hobson 
 Lee J. Cobb as Inspector Koch
 Ellen Drew as Nelle Marchettis 
 Nina Foch as Harriet Hobson 
 Thomas Gomez as Guido Marchettis (as 'S. Thomas Gomez')
 John Kellogg as Charlie
 Jim Bannon as Chuck Blayden
 Mabel Paige as Slatternly Woman Tenant
 Phil Brown as Phil, Hotel Clerk
 Jeff Chandler as Turk (uncredited)
 Robin Raymond as Hatcheck Girl (uncredited)

Production
The film was based on an original story by Milton Holmes. Rights were bought by Columbia, who originally tried to assign the project to Charles Vidor who refused (something which later came up when Vidor sued Columbia). Evelyn Keyes was given the female lead. Lee J. Cobb was borrowed from 20th Century Fox to play a support role. Thomas Gomez was borrowed from Universal.

Dick Powell acted on radio with Jeff Chandler and was impressed by the young actor. Chandler later recalled, "It was Dick who took me to Columbia and told everybody who would listen, 'This kid ought to be in pictures.' One executive finally kinda gave him a look which said: 'All right you --- ---, we'll put him in yours.' And that's how I came to play a gambler in a card playing sequence."

Filming started 10 July 1946.

Reception
Time Out film guide notes "Despite good performances and fine camerawork from Burnett Guffey, Rossen's first film as director is a disappointingly flat thriller...Since they remain totally unmemorable (through no fault of the actors concerned), the subsequent action tends to become little more than a sequence of events mechanically strung together."

The staff at Variety magazine gave the film kudos, writing, "This is a smart whodunit, with attention to scripting, casting and camerawork lifting it above the average. Pic has action and suspense, and certain quick touches of humor to add flavor. Ace performances by Dick Powell, as a gambling house overseer, and Lee J. Cobb, as a police inspector, also up the rating...Although the plot follows a familiar pattern, the characterizations are fresh and the performances good enough to overbalance. Dialog is terse and topical, avoiding the sentimental, phoney touch. Unusual camera angles come along now and then to heighten interest and momentarily arrest the eye. Strong teamplay by Robert Rossen, doubling as director-scripter, and Milton Holmes, original writer and associate producer, also aids in making this a smooth production."

Film critic Bosley Crowther gave the film a mixed review, criticizing it for slow pacing, writing, "But the slowness and general confusion of the plot for two-thirds of the film does not make for notable excitement, and the shallowness of the mystery as to who's doing all the killing relieves it of any great suspense. It is mainly a matter of watching Mr. Powell go through his paces stylishly while a large cast of actors and actresses give him customary support. Evelyn Keyes plays the good little lady who brings out the best in him and Ellen Drew is the sleek and slinky vixen who gets him into jams. Thomas Gomez is oily as the villain and Lee J. Cobb does another able tour as a weary police inspector who finally closes the case. A great deal of drinking, and smoking is done by all concerned."

References

External links
 
 
 Review of film at Variety
 
 
 

1947 films
1940s crime thriller films
American crime thriller films
American black-and-white films
Columbia Pictures films
1940s English-language films
Film noir
Films scored by George Duning
Films directed by Robert Rossen
Films with screenplays by Robert Rossen
Films about gambling
1940s American films